Afipsky is an urban locality (an urban-type settlement) in Seversky District of Krasnodar Krai, Russia, located on the left bank of the Afips River,  from Krasnodar. Population: 

It was founded in 1865 as the stanitsa of Georgiyeafipskaya. Urban-type settlement status was granted to it on April 15, 1958.

A professional football team FC Afips Afipsky is based there.

References

Urban-type settlements in Krasnodar Krai
Populated places in Seversky District
https://afipskiy.ru/